More Whiskey for Callaghan (French: Plus de whisky pour Callaghan) is a 1955 French thriller film directed by Willy Rozier and starring Tony Wright, Magali Vendeuil and Robert Berri. It is an adaptation of the 1941 novel It Couldn't Matter Less by British writer Peter Cheyney featuring the private detective Slim Callaghan. It was the second film featuring English actor Wright as Callaghan following Your Turn, Callaghan.

Cast
Tony Wright as Slim Callaghan
 Magali Vendeuil as Doria Varette 
 Robert Berri as Comte Haragos
 Jean-Max as 	Commodore Schoubersky 
 Diana Bel as Irania Trasmonti
 Mario David as Amédée
 Joé Davray as Inspecteur Vadet 
 Michel Etcheverry as Prof. Ephraim Ponticollo 
 Manuéla De Ségovia as 	La Montalban 
 Christiane Barry as Comtesse Haragos
 Robert Burnier as Nicholls
 Fernand Rauzéna as Gonzalès
 Frédéric O'Brady as Souvaroff

References

Bibliography 
 Goble, Alan. The Complete Index to Literary Sources in Film. Walter de Gruyter, 1999.
 Rège, Philippe. Encyclopedia of French Film Directors, Volume 1. Scarecrow Press, 2009.

External links 
 

1955 films
1950s crime thriller films
1955 crime films
French crime thriller films
1950s French-language films
Films directed by Willy Rozier
Films based on British novels
French black-and-white films
1950s French films

fr:Plus de whisky pour Callaghan